Cristian Nicolás Sosa De Luca (born 19 February 1985), known as Cristian Sosa, is a Uruguayan footballer who plays for Italian club Arzachena, mainly as a right defender.

Career
Early in his career, played for the Uruguayan clubs Defensor Sporting and Plaza Colonia. However, he did not get enough match practice (in the "Violetas" he played only six matches in the national championship), and the summer of 2008 he moved to Italy to play for Taranto.

After playing a season in the Serie C1, he was transferred to the Serie B club Gallipoli, for which he played 34 games until 2010. His team entered a huge crisis and was relegated to Serie C.

In September 2010, Sosa was transferred to the Romanian Liga I side FCM Târgu Mureş as a free agent, after his previous team went bankrupt.

In early 2011, he returned to Taranto playing in the Serie C1. Playing regularly in the first team, twice participated in the playoffs for an exit to Serie B, but both times the team did not manage to upgrade to business class.

In mid-2012, after his team Taranto went bankrupt, he agreed a new deal with Serie B side Cittadella. On 25 September 2012, he scored his first goal in the 2–2 draw match against Livorno.

In January 2014 he goes to Venezia; since the summer of the same year he played for Alessandria, where he became captain in the 2016–17 season.

On 16 July 2019, he signed a contract with Sicula Leonzio for one year with an option for another year.

On 16 August 2021, he signed with Arzachena in Serie D.

Notes

References

External links

1985 births
Living people
Uruguayan footballers
Defensor Sporting players
Plaza Colonia players
ASA 2013 Târgu Mureș players
Taranto F.C. 1927 players
A.S. Cittadella players
Venezia F.C. players
U.S. Alessandria Calcio 1912 players
Modena F.C. players
Alma Juventus Fano 1906 players
Arzachena Academy Costa Smeralda players
Uruguayan Primera División players
Serie B players
Serie C players
Serie D players
Liga I players
Expatriate footballers in Italy
Expatriate footballers in Romania
Uruguayan expatriate sportspeople in Italy
Uruguayan expatriate sportspeople in Romania
Association football defenders